Gyeyang Gymnasium is an indoor arena located Gyeyang District, Incheon, South Korea. It is built to host badminton and karate competitions of 2014 Asian Games.

References

Sports venues in Incheon
Indoor arenas in South Korea
Volleyball venues in South Korea
Badminton venues
Venues of the 2014 Asian Games
Asian Games badminton venues
Asian Games karate venues